Steve Clarke was born in London, England on 20 November 1959. He is a former member of Quasar and Fastway.

Life and career 

Steve Clarke was born in Twickenham on 20 November 1959 to parents Eric and Sally Clarke. Steve started playing drums aged four under tuition from his uncle, Jeff Whetstone and father Eric Clarke. Subsequently, he joined the Boys' Brigade where he developed his rudimentary and marching techniques. Aged 21, Steve worked as a tech for drummer Billy Cobham.

He organised and played in an improvised gig at the Hamborough Tavern in Southall, with guitarists Steve Topping, Richard Chapman and bass guitarist Nick Stephens.
The cassette recording of the jam was released on CD retrospectively (18 years later) in 1999 under the name Volume 33 Riot at The Hanborough Tavern.

From 1979 to 1980 Clarke had a brief stint in the progressive rock band Quasar alongside guitarist John Clark, who left to join Bruford.

Also in the 80's, Steve worked closely with Jeff Pain a.k.a. 'Dicken' from UK band Mr Big, recording a number of songs which would not see the light of day for a few years to come. Steve also recorded drums on the album 'Rainbow Bridge'.

Network 

In 1986 Steve formed the group 'Network' with guitarist Tim Crowther keyboard player Pete Jacobsen bassists Paul Rogers and Laurence Cottle and trumpet player Ted Emmett, augmented by the likes of Steve Topping, David Cross from King Crimson and Hugh Hopper of Soft Machine. The band would go on to make four albums and a best of compilation entitled "View From The Bar".

The album Corroded Path, recorded in 1989 was described by Bradley Smith in the Billboard Guide To Progressive Music as follows:

"Corroded Path is a minor treasure of UK fusion, directly picking up where groups like Brand X and Bruford left off. Eight tracks follow the friendlier and melodic paths of fusion, with a swinging smoothness that isn't earth shattering but is easy to like. The accent here is on concise, jazzy arrangements, with Crowther's restrained guitar soloing recalling some of the best of Allan Holdsworth and Al Di Meola. Imagine Bill Bruford's Earthworks band electrified and you get the sound of Network. Emmett's Miles Davis-like solos are superb, particularly when he is more up-front as on "Obsessive Behaviour". Occasionally the funky bass lines and piano breaks resemble Return to Forever, and Clarke's big drum sound vividly recalls Bill Bruford and Phil Collins-era Brand X. The sound quality is good throughout, with production values ideal for an analog recording like this. Like Chad Wickerman's The View in the United States, Network's Corroded Path successfully continues the most attractive band dynamics of the jazz-rock fusion form."

Steve wrote and produced the landmark album entitled "LNC", which was recorded in 1996 with guitarist Keith More, and Steve Topping guest solos on one track notably joined by keyboard legend Jan Hammer. This took Steve's music to a larger worldwide audience including playing concerts in the USA. As a result of playing in New York, the 1998 collaboration with guitarist Larry Coryell followed as a step forward to showcase Steve's compositions. The tracks featured Pete Jacobsen on keyboards and Wolfgang Schmid on guitar, plus Jack Bruce on bass and vocals on a cover of the Hendrix classic Manic Depression. Entitled "Highly Committed Media Players" it would become Steve's most well known album to date. He followed this by recording the album "Solo Drums" in May 2000. One of the pieces featured a tribute to an early mentor and friend of his father and uncle, Phil Seaman. Steve was then inducted as a fellow of the British Library for his services to progressive music.

During this period, in 1993 Steve hooked up with his good friend Zak Starkey and formed a band 'Spin Out' that featured Zak on guitar, Gary Roberts on bass, Gary Nuttall on guitar and Steve Barnard a.k.a. 'Smiley' on occasional drums/guitar.

For several years, Steve ran a multi-track audio and video recording complex and 2013 saw him write, play on and produce a new album featuring famous trumpeter Randy Brecker.

Fastway 

In 1987 Steve joined the heavy rock/Metal band Fastway led by brother Fast Eddie Clarke formerly of Motörhead. Steve played on the album 'On Target' and fulfilled live duties. In 1989 Clarke hooked up with Tank, led by Algy Ward whilst also working with bassist Gerry McAvoy. Clarke and Ward joined Judge Trev Thoms for the Necropolis- "End Of The Line" album featuring Bill Liesegang, ex Motörhead guitarist Würzel Burston and Steve was re-united with Fast Eddie Clarke and John Clarke. Steve also appeared on two all star albums for Japanese Polydor Records that would see him recording with Don Airey and Scott Gorham.

Tank & Atomgod 
Steve also joined UK heavy rock band Atomgods (who became Atomgod) on their release 'History Re-Written' through GWR records in 1991, which also featured film/TV producer Lee Phillips on keyboards, Trev Thoms(HAWKWIND), Bill Leisegang(Nina Hagen, Jack Bruce). Atomgod led Steve to become the house drummer at GWR records, playing with Huw Lloyd Langton and notably TANK, where he fulfilled live duties.

Leader Of Down 

Steve is currently active as the drummer of Leader Of Down, the last band of Würzel,  and bassist Tim Atkinson. Their debut album "Cascade Into Chaos" was released in late 2016 and features some of the last recordings by the late Lemmy, along with Phil Campbell and Eddie Clarke who died January 10, 2018, after a battle with Pneumonia.

Discography 

 Applying Rudiments to Improvisation 2015
 Solo Drums 2002
 Highly Committed Media Players 2002
 Last Throw of the Dice 2001
 LNC  2000
 Precisely The Oppposte 1999
 End of the Line 1997
 Refusal to Comply 1995
 Corroded Path 1994
 Bible Says 1992
 History Re-Written 1991
 On Target 1988
 Riot 1982

References

External links
 http://www.mtv.com/artists/quasar/biography/

English rock drummers
1959 births
Living people
Fastway (band) members